Can I Take My Hounds to Heaven? is the fifth studio album by American country music singer Tyler Childers. It was released on September 30, 2022 via Hickman Holler. The album consists of three discs, each containing different remixes of eight gospel music songs.

Content
The album is a gospel music project featuring Childers' touring band, The Food Stamps. The band recorded eight different gospel songs, each in three different versions: a "Hallelujah" version, a "Jubilee" version, and a "Joyful Noise" version. The "Hallelujah" versions were recorded live in the studio; the "Jubilee" versions incorporate horn sections and string sections; and the "Joyful Noise" versions co-produced by Charlie Brown Superstar incorporate remixes and sampling. "Old Country Church" is a cover of Hank Williams, while "Purgatory" is a re-recording of a song from Childers' 2017 album of the same name.

Critical reception
Stephen Thomas Erlewine of AllMusic rated the album 4.5 out of 5 stars, praising the musicianship of The Food Stamps as well as the influences of soul music and Dixieland jazz present in the "Joyful Noise" versions of songs.

Track listing
"The Old Country Church", "Two Coats", and "Jubilee" are public domain; all other tracks written by Tyler Childers.

Charts

References

2022 albums
Tyler Childers albums